Riina Solman (born 23 June 1972) is an Estonian politician. She served as Minister of Population Affairs in the second cabinet of Jüri Ratas from 29 April 2019 to 26 January 2021. The office of Minister of Population Affairs was removed in the cabinet of Prime Minister Kaja Kallas.

References 

1972 births
21st-century Estonian politicians
21st-century Estonian women politicians
Government ministers of Estonia
Isamaa politicians
Living people
Members of the Riigikogu, 2023–2027
People from Viljandi
Tallinn University alumni
Women government ministers of Estonia